Nyby may refer to:

People
 Christian I. Nyby II (born 1941), American television director
 Christian Nyby (1913–1993), American television and film director and editor
 Mats Nyby (1946–2021), Finnish politician

Places
 Nyby or Nieby, Germany
 Nyby bruk, Sweden
 Nyby, Siuntio, Finland